Carex rupestris, called the curly sedge and rock sedge (names it shares with other members of its genus), is a species of flowering plant in the family Cyperaceae, native to temperate and subarctic North America, Greenland, Iceland, Europe, and Asia. It prefers to grow on rocky ledges.

Subtaxa
The following subspecies are currently accepted:
Carex rupestris subsp. altimontana 
Carex rupestris subsp. rupestris

References

rupestris
Flora of Europe
Flora of the North Caucasus
Flora of Siberia
Flora of Kazakhstan
Flora of the Russian Far East
Flora of Mongolia
Flora of Korea
Flora of Subarctic America
Flora of Western Canada
Flora of Eastern Canada
Flora of the Northwestern United States
Flora of South Dakota
Flora of Utah
Flora of New Mexico
Plants described in 1785